Kaimes is a suburb of Edinburgh, the capital of Scotland. It is south of Alnwickhill.

Sources
(Google Maps)

Areas of Edinburgh